Dei Rural LLG is a local-level government (LLG) of Western Highlands Province, Papua New Guinea.

Wards
01. Muglamp.1
02. Muglamp.2
03. Mun
04. Gumanch.1
05. Gumanch.2
06. Kuk 1
07. Mopi
08. Keta
09. Keraldong
10. Kumbunga
11. Moga
12. Pung
13. Rauna
14. Kamund
15. Kenembomuka
18. Kenabuga.1
19. Bitam
29. Kindal
30. Palgi
31. Komapana
36. Kelem.1
39. Tigi.2
40. Kenabuga.2
42. Klenembo
47. Tigi.1

References

Local-level governments of Western Highlands Province